The 2011 Asian Weightlifting Championships were held at Tongling Municipal Stadium in Tongling, Anhui Province, China between April 13 and April 17, 2011. It was the 42nd men's and 23rd women's championship.

Medal summary

Men

Women

Medal table 

Ranking by Big (Total result) medals 

Ranking by all medals: Big (Total result) and Small (Snatch and Clean & Jerk)

Team ranking

Men

Women

Participating nations 
94 athletes from 20 nations competed.

 (2)
 (15)
 (4)
 (1)
 (5)
 (8)
 (7)
 (12)
 (1)
 (1)
 (2)
 (1)
 (9)
 (1)
 (6)
 (1)
 (3)
 (1)
 (3)
 (11)

References
Results Book
Results at iwf.net

Asian Weightlifting Championships
Asian
W
International weightlifting competitions hosted by China